The following is a list of awards and nominations received by American cartoonist, writer, producer, and animator Matt Groening.

Annie Awards

Environmental Media Awards

Golden Globe Awards

People's Choice Awards

Primetime Emmy Awards

TCA Awards

Teen Choice Awards

Other awards

References

External links

Lists of awards received by writer